Legislature of Georgia may refer to

the Parliament of Georgia, the unicameral legislature of the independent country of Georgia
the Senate (Georgia), the prospective upper house of the GGA
the Council of the Republic (Georgia), the prospective lower house of the GGA
the Georgia General Assembly, the bicameral legislature of the U.S. State of Georgia
the Georgia State Senate, the upper house of the GGA
the Georgia House of Representatives, the lower house of the GGA